Marta Brunet (August 9, 1897 in Chillán, Chile – October 27, 1967 in Montevideo), was a Chilean writer. She was a recipient of the National Prize for Literature.

Life and work 
She was the only child of Ambrosio Brunet Molina and his Spanish wife María Presentación Cáraves de Colosia. Her mother was a disabled person which led to Marta being largely taught at home by tutors. In her teen years she traveled to Europe with her parents and became influenced by the authors there. In 1923 her first novel appeared and was noted for its realistic portrayal of country life. By 1929 she lived in Santiago and had won a literary prize for a short story. Her writings began to involve urban life more after this and her 1946 work Humo hacia el sur [Smoke on the Southern shore], involving urban society, would be one of her most noted. Later she became second secretary to the Chilean embassy, but was asked to resign by the government of Carlos Ibáñez del Campo In her career as a writer she was the recipient of various awards including the National Literary Award in 1961.

Works 
 Montaña adentro, 1923.
 Bestia dañina, 1926.
 María Rosa, flor de Quillén, 1927.
 Bienvenido, 1929.
 Reloj de sol, 1930.
 Cuentos para Marisol, 1938.
 Aguas abajo, 1943.
 Humo hacia el sur, 1946.
 La mampara, 1946.
 Raíz del seño, 1949.
 María Nadie, 1957.
 Aleluyas para los más chiquititos, 1960.
 Amasijo, 1962.
 Obras completas, 1962.
 Soledad de la sangre, 1967.
 Piedra Callada, 1946

Web sources 

1897 births
1967 deaths
People from Chillán
Chilean diplomats
Chilean people of Catalan descent
Chilean people of Spanish descent
Chilean people of Swiss descent
National Prize for Literature (Chile) winners
Members of the Uruguayan Academy of Language
Chilean women novelists
20th-century Chilean novelists
20th-century Chilean women writers